Luca Brasi 2 is the twelfth commercial mixtape by American rapper Kevin Gates. It was released on December 14, 2014, through his own independent record label Bread Winners' Association and Atlantic Records.

Commercial performance
Luca Brasi 2 debuted at number 38 on the US Billboard 200, with 26,224 album-equivalent units (including pure album sales of 22,892 copies) in its first week. As of October 2015, the album has sold 83,000 copies in the United States. On September 7, 2018, the mixtape was certified platinum by the Recording Industry Association of America (RIAA) for combined sales and album-equivalent units of over a million units in the United States.

Track listing

Charts

Weekly charts

Year-end charts

Certifications

References

2014 mixtape albums
Kevin Gates albums
Albums produced by the Runners
Albums produced by Rico Love
Albums produced by Kane Beatz
Albums produced by B.o.B
Sequel albums